Charles Williams (1888-1935) was English rackets world champion.

Rackets career
Williams became a professional rackets player and the school coach at a young age, playing from the Harrow Club at Harrow School. In January 1911 he competed in and won the Open Championship of England defeating Edgar Maximilian Baerlein. Just over three months later he was the challenger for the World Championship against the holder Jamsetji Merwanji from India. Williams won the first leg at the Queen's Club and then in the second leg played out a draw at the Prince's Club after he had already secured the one game he needed to claim the title outright. He had become the world champion aged just 22.

He lost the Championship to Jock Soutar from the United States in 1913 before failing to regain the title in a rematch in 1922. He finally regained the Championship after beating Soutar in 1929.

Personal life
Born in East Fulham in 1888, he was a ball boy at the Prince's Club before turning professional. He resided in the United States from 1924 and was married and had six children.

He died in 1935 while living in Chicago aged 47.

References and notes

1888 births
1935 deaths
People from Fulham
World rackets champion
People educated at Harrow School
RMS Titanic survivors